Qingliu is the Hanyu Pinyin romanisation for several different places in China. It may mean:

Qingliu County (清流县) in the municipal region of Sanming, Fujian
Qingliu Town in Xindu District, Chengdu Municipality, Sichuan